Jezdić is a Serbian surname, a patronymic derived from Jezda, a diminutive of Jezdimir. Bearers of the surname are widespread throughout former Yugoslavia. It may refer to:

Jevrem Jezdić (1916–1997), Yugoslav historian, publicist and writer
Ljuba Jezdić (1884–1927), Serbian guerrilla fighter
Nenad Jezdić, Serbian actor
Oliver Jezdić, Yugoslav musician, member of Galija

See also
Jezdići, village in Serbia
Prijezdići, village in Serbia

Serbian surnames